John D. Perdue (born June 22, 1950) is an American politician who served as the 24th West Virginia State Treasurer from 1997 to 2021. He was an unsuccessful candidate in the 2011 West Virginia gubernatorial special election.  Perdue is a member of the  Democratic Party.

Perdue served as state treasurer for six terms, before losing reelection to Riley Moore in 2020.

Electoral history

References

External links
West Virginia State Treasurer

1950 births
21st-century American politicians
Baptists from West Virginia
Living people
People from Boone County, West Virginia
People from Kanawha County, West Virginia
State treasurers of West Virginia
West Virginia Democrats
West Virginia University alumni